The American Tri-Car was made by the Tri-Car Co of America, Denver, Colorado, United States, in 1912. It was a three-wheeler, with the one rear wheel being both the drive wheel and the only braked wheel. It was powered by a 13 hp, air-cooled 2-cylinder engine and used a planetary transmission. The company failed by the end of the year.

References

Brass Era vehicles
Defunct motor vehicle manufacturers of the United States
Defunct companies based in Colorado